Jim Grabb and Patrick McEnroe were the defending champions, but lost in the first round to Scott Davis and Tim Wilkison.

John McEnroe and Mark Woodforde won the title by defeating Davis and Wilkison 6–4, 7–6 in the final.

Seeds

Draw

Draw

References

External links
 Official results archive (ATP)
 Official results archive (ITF)

Doubles